Douglas Fowley (born Daniel Vincent Fowley, May 30, 1911 – May 21, 1998) was an American movie and television actor in more than 240 films and dozens of television programs, He is probably best remembered for his role as the frustrated movie director Roscoe Dexter in Singin' in the Rain (1952), and for his regular supporting role as Doc Holliday in The Life and Legend of Wyatt Earp.  He was the father of rock and roll musician and record producer Kim Fowley.

Early years
Fowley was born in The Bronx in New York City. He began acting while attending St. Francis Xavier Military Academy. He later attended Los Angeles City College.

Fowley began as a singing waiter and then worked as a copy boy for The New York Times, a runner for a Wall Street broker, a United States Postal Service employee, a barker, a salesman, a professional football player, and finally a professional actor.

Military service
Fowley's enlistment in the United States Navy during World War II led to his being wounded when he served on an aircraft carrier in the Pacific Ocean.
He was aboard an aircraft carrier when an explosion knocked out his teeth. The dental setback hardly slowed his career as an actor. In fact, he ended up portraying one of the most well-known dentists in American history. "I had a false upper plate, having lost my upper teeth prematurely in mid-life," he explained to Western Clippings in 1994. "I started playing old character roles by removing my false upper plate, adding a beard, voice and gait to match my interpretation."

Film 
After nightclub performing and stage work, Fowley appeared in 1933 in his first film, The Mad Game, alongside Spencer Tracy. Early in his acting career, he was usually cast as a movie heavy or gangster in B-movies, including Charlie Chan and Laurel and Hardy features.

Fowley's films include Twenty Mule Team, Fall Guy, Mighty Joe Young, Angels in the Outfield, Battleground, Armored Car Robbery, Chick Carter, Detective, The Naked Jungle, The High and the Mighty, and Walking Tall.

Television

Regular cast
For several seasons, Fowley played the key supporting role of John H. "Doc" Holliday in the 1955-1961 western television series The Life and Legend of Wyatt Earp after having appeared as Doc Fabrique in the show's premiere season. This role allowed Fowley to demonstrate his flair for comedy and other acting skills as a clever, sharp-witted, sardonic, cynical, alcoholic, poker-playing foil to the square-jawed, milk-drinking, church-going Wyatt Earp (Hugh O'Brian), whom Holiday nicknamed "Deacon" due to his rigid sense of morality. Not at all so encumbered Doc would occasionally take the law into his own hands behind Earp's back to protect his friend from legal action or even death when the marshal was legally or morally ham-strung. Holliday, as played by Fowley, having no problem working around morals or the law, could be either hilarious or cold-blooded.

From 1966 to 1967, Fowley portrayed Andrew Hanks in Pistols 'n' Petticoats, a CBS sitcom. Hanks was the patriarch in a family of gun-toting women who seemed to have little need for male assistance.

Fowley portrayed retired businessman Robert Redford in Detective School (1979).

Guest appearances 
In the 1950s, he appeared as himself on NBC's The Donald O'Connor Show. In 1954, he demonstrated his comic appeal when he appeared alongside Gracie Allen in The George Burns and Gracie Allen Show.  He was cast in 1956 as Bob Egan in the "Two-Fisted Saint" episode of the religious anthology series Crossroads. He portrayed a con man in two episodes of the NBC sitcom It's a Great Life. He also guest-starred on Reed Hadley's CBS legal drama The Public Defender. He appeared, too, on the ABC situation comedy The Pride of the Family and on the NBC Western series The Californians and Jefferson Drum. He was cast on two Rod Cameron series, the syndicated City Detective and the Western-themed State Trooper, and in John Bromfield's series, U.S. Marshal. He guest-starred in the David Janssen crime drama Richard Diamond, Private Detective and guest-starred in season two, episode four of the Robert Culp Western Trackdown.

In 1959, Fowley appeared with Frank Ferguson in the episode "A Race for Life" of the CBS Western series The Texan, starring Rory Calhoun.

December 30, 1963, Fowley guest starred in an episode of the Andy Griffith show, “Opie and his Merry Men”, as a hobo.  Opie and his friends stole food from the “rich” and gave to the hobo, who quickly refused Andy’s help in finding a job.

In 1964, Fowley made a guest appearance on the CBS courtroom drama series Perry Mason playing agent Rubin Cason in "The Case of the Bountiful Beauty". In 1965, he was cast as Sorrowful in episode 83 of the series The Virginian.  
In 1966, he appeared as "Rufus C. Hoops" in "The Search" season 2, episode 24, of the series "Daniel Boone". Original air date for this episode was March 3, 1966. In 1967, Fowley guest-starred on the short-lived CBS Western Dundee and the Culhane with John Mills.

In 1968, he appeared in episode 273 of My Three Sons as an old pal of Uncle Charley's. He had a role in the syndicated 1959-1960 Western Pony Express in the episode "Showdown at Thirty Mile Ridge". He was cast in 1963 in Miracle of the White Stallions.

Fowley was usually typecast as a villain; when not playing an actual criminal, he often portrayed an argumentative troublemaker. Portraying a member of Tyrone Power's orchestra in Alexander's Ragtime Band, in the early scenes of the film, Fowley's character quarrels with his bandmates, but this is not developed in the film's later scenes.

Fowley continued to act into the 1970s and was frequently billed as "Douglas V. Fowley". One of his last roles was as Delaney Rafferty in Disney's The North Avenue Irregulars, in which he dressed in drag.

Personal life
Fowley was married eight times and had six children. His first marriage was to a woman named Maria. He remarried to Marjorie Reid in 1935, they divorced the next year. Fowley later married to actress Shelby Payne in 1938 and divorced in 1943. He then married to Mary Rose Hunter in 1944 and later to Vivian M. Chambers in 1947. Fowley then was married to Joy A. Torstup from 1950 to 1954, and later to Judy Walsh the following year, and divorced in 1956.
Finally, Fowley married Jean Louise Paschall in 1961, and they remained together until Douglas's death. His children were Douglas Jr., Kim, Daniel, Gretchen and Kip.

Death 
Fowley died nine days before what would have been his 87th birthday. He was buried at the Murrieta, California, Laurel Cemetery.

Selected filmography

 The Woman Who Dared (1933) as Kay's Boyfriend
 The Mad Game (1933) as Gangster (uncredited)
 Sleepers East (1934) as Gangster (uncredited)
 I Hate Women (1934) as Nelson
 The Thin Man (1934) as Taxi Driver (uncredited)
 Let's Talk It Over (1934) as Sailor Jones
 Operator 13 (1934) as Union Officer (uncredited)
 Money Means Nothing (1934) as Red Miller (uncredited)
 The Girl from Missouri (1934) as New Bellboy with Vase (uncredited)
 Gift of Gab (1934) as Mac
 Student Tour (1934) as Mushy
 Night Life of the Gods (1935) as Cyril Sparks
 Transient Lady (1935) as Matt Baxter
 Straight from the Heart (1935) as Speed Spelvin
 Princess O'Hara (1935) as Emcee (uncredited)
 Old Man Rhythm (1935) as Oyster (uncredited)
 Two for Tonight (1935) as Pooch Donahue
 Miss Pacific Fleet (1935) as Second (scenes deleted)
 Ring Around the Moon (1936) as Ted Curlew
 Big Brown Eyes (1936) as Benny Battle
 Small Town Girl (1936) as Chick Page (uncredited)
 Mariners of the Sky (1936) as Lt. Steve Bassett
 Private Number (1936) as Sheik - Man Causing Brawl (uncredited)
 36 Hours to Kill (1936) as Duke Benson
 Crash Donovan (1936) as Harris
 Sing, Baby, Sing (1936) as Mac
 Dimples (1936) as Stranger (uncredited)
 15 Maiden Lane (1936) as Nick Shelby
 Woman-Wise (1937) as Stevens
 On the Avenue (1937) as Eddie Eads
 Time Out for Romance (1937) as Roy Webster
 This Is My Affair (1937) as Alec
 Fifty Roads to Town (1937) as Dutch Nelson
 She Had to Eat (1937) as Duke Stacey
 Wake Up and Live (1937) as Herman
 Wild and Woolly (1937) as Blackie Morgan
 One Mile from Heaven (1937) as Jim Tabor
 Charlie Chan on Broadway (1937) as Johnny Burke
 Love and Hisses (1937) as Mobster Webster
 City Girl (1938) as Ritchie
 Walking Down Broadway (1938) as Ace Wagner
 Mr. Moto's Gamble (1938) as Nick Crowder
 Alexander's Ragtime Band (1938) as Snapper
 Passport Husband (1938) as Tiger Martin
 Keep Smiling (1938) as Cedric Hunt
 Time Out for Murder (1938) as J.E. 'Dutch' Moran 
 Submarine Patrol (1938) as Seaman Pinky Brett
 The Arizona Wildcat (1939) as Rufe Galloway
 Inside Story (1939) as Gus Brawley
 Dodge City (1939) as Munger
 Lucky Night (1939) as George
 Boy Friend (1939) as Ed Boyd
 It Could Happen to You (1939) as Freddie Barlow
 Charlie Chan at Treasure Island (1939) as Pete Lewis
 Henry Goes Arizona (1939) as Ricky Dole
 Slightly Honorable (1939) as Madder
 Cafe Hostess (1940) as Eddie Morgan
 20 Mule Team (1940) as Stag Roper
 Wagons Westward (1940) as Bill Marsden
 Pier 13 (1940) as Johnnie Hale
 The Leather Pushers (1940) as Slick Connolly
 Cherokee Strip (1940) as Alf Barrett
 East of the River (1940) as Cy Turner
 Ellery Queen, Master Detective (1940) as Rocky Taylor
 The Great Swindle (1941) as Rocky Andrews
 The Parson of Panamint (1941) as Chappie Ellerton
 Tanks a Million (1941) as Capt. Rossmead
 Dangerous Lady (1941) as Police Sgt. Brent
 Doctors Don't Tell (1941) as Joe Grant
 Secret of the Wastelands (1941) as Slade Salters
 Mr. District Attorney (1941) as Vincent Mackay
 Hay Foot (1942) as Captain Rossmead
 Mr. Wise Guy (1942) as Bill Collins
 Sunset on the Desert (1942) as Ramsay McCall
 So's Your Aunt Emma (1942) as Gus Hammond
 Mississippi Gambler (1942) as Chet Matthews
 I Live on Danger (1942) as Joey Farr
 Somewhere I'll Find You (1942) as Army Captain (uncredited)
 The Man in the Trunk (1942) as Ed Mygatt
 Pittsburgh (1942) as Mort Frawley (uncredited)
 Lost Canyon (1942) as Jeff Burton
 Stand by for Action (1942) as Ensign Martin
 Gildersleeve's Bad Day (1943) as Louie Barton
 Dr. Gillespie's Criminal Case (1943) as Wallace (uncredited)
 Jitterbugs (1943) as Malcolm Bennett
 Colt Comrades (1943) as Joe Brass
 Sleepy Lagoon (1943) as J. 'The Brain' Lucarno
 Swing Shift Maisie (1943) as Investigator (uncredited)
 The Kansan (1943) as Ben Nash
 Bar 20 (1943) as Henchman Slash
 The Chance of a Lifetime (1943) as Nails Blanton (uncredited)
 Minesweeper (1943) as Cutter Lt. Wells
 Riding High (1943) as Brown (uncredited)
 The Racket Man (1944) as Toby Sykes
 Lady in the Death House (1944) as Dr. Dwight 'Brad' Bradford
 See Here, Private Hargrove (1944) as Capt. R.S. Manville
 Rationing (1944) as Dixie Samson
 Shake Hands with Murder (1944) as Steve Morgan
 And the Angels Sing (1944) as N.Y. Cafe Manager (uncredited)
 Detective Kitty O'Day (1944) as Harry Downs
 Johnny Doesn't Live Here Anymore (1944) as Rudy (uncredited)
 One Body Too Many (1944) as Henry Rutherford
 Behind City Lights (1945) as Taxi Driver (uncredited)
 Along the Navajo Trail (1945) as J. Richard Bentley
 Don't Fence Me In (1945) as Jack Gordon
 What Next, Corporal Hargrove? (1945) as Colonel (uncredited)
 Life with Blondie (1945) as Blackie Leonard (uncredited)
 Drifting Along  (1946) as Jack Dailey
 Blonde Alibi (1946) as Henchman Willie (uncredited)
 The Glass Alibi (1946) as Joe Eykner
 Rendezvous 24 (1946) as Chief Agent Hanover (uncredited)
 Larceny in Her Heart (1946) as Doc H. C. Patterson
 In Fast Company (1946) as Steve Trent
 Freddie Steps Out (1946) as Coach Carter
 Chick Carter, Detective (1946, Serial) as Rusty Farrell
 High School Hero (1946) as Coach Carter
 Her Sister's Secret (1946) as Navy Officer (uncredited)
 Wild Country (1947) as Clark Varney
 Scared to Death (1947) as Terry Lee
 The Sea of Grass (1947) as Joe Horton (uncredited)
 Backlash (1947) as Red Bailey
 Undercover Maisie (1947) as Daniels
 Fall Guy (1947) as Inspector Shannon
 Yankee Fakir (1947) as Yankee Davis
 Three on a Ticket (1947) as Mace Morgan
 Fun on a Weekend (1947) as Gambling House Owner (uncredited)
 Jungle Flight (1947) as Tom Hammond
 Desperate (1947) as Pete Lavitch
 The Trespasser (1947) as Bill Monroe
 The Hucksters (1947) as Georgie Gaver
 Gas House Kids in Hollywood (1947) as Mitch Gordon
 Ridin' Down the Trail (1947) as Mark Butler
 Key Witness (1947) as Jim Guthrie (uncredited)
 Merton of the Movies (1947) as Phil
 Roses Are Red (1947) as Ace Oliver
 Rose of Santa Rosa (1947) as Larry Fish
 If You Knew Susie (1948) as Marty
 Black Bart (1948) as Sheriff Mix (uncredited)
 Docks of New Orleans (1948) as Grock
 The Dude Goes West (1948) as Beetle
 Waterfront at Midnight (1948) as Joe Sargus
 Coroner Creek (1948) as Stew Shallis
 The Arkansas Swing (1948) as Howard, the Horse Trainer
 Behind Locked Doors (1948) as Larson
 Joe Palooka in Winner Take All (1948) as Reporter #1
 The Denver Kid (1948) as Henchman Slip
 Gun Smugglers (1948) as Steve Reeves
 Bad Men of Tombstone (1949) as Gambler (uncredited)
 Flaxy Martin (1949) as Max, Detective
 Take Me Out to the Ball Game (1949) as Karl (uncredited)
 Manhattan Angel (1949) as Mr. Fowley - Press Photographer (uncredited)
 Search for Danger (1949) as Inspector
 Susanna Pass (1949) as Roberts aka Walter P. Johnson
 Arson, Inc. (1949) as Frederick P. Fender
 Massacre River (1949) as Simms
 Any Number Can Play (1949) as Smitty (uncredited)
 Mighty Joe Young (1949) as Jones
 Joe Palooka in the Counterpunch (1949) as Thurston
 Satan's Cradle (1949) as Steve Gentry
 Battleground (1949) as "Kipp" Kippton
 Renegades of the Sage (1949) as Sloper
 Killer Shark (1950) as Louie Bracado
 Beware of Blondie (1950) as Adolph
 Hoedown (1950) as Gang Leader (uncredited)
 Rider from Tucson (1950) as Bob Rankin
 Armored Car Robbery (1950) as Benny McBride
 Edge of Doom (1950) as 2nd Detective
 Bunco Squad (1950) as Det. Sgt. Mack McManus
 Rio Grande Patrol (1950) as Bragg Orket
 He's a Cockeyed Wonder (1950) as 'Crabs' Freeley
 Mrs. O'Malley and Mr. Malone (1950) as Steve Kepplar
 Stage to Tucson (1950) as Ira Prentiss
 Tarzan's Peril (1951) as Herbert Trask
 Criminal Lawyer (1951) as Harry Cheney
 Chain of Circumstance (1951) as Lt. Fenning
 Angels in the Outfield (1951) as Cab Driver (uncredited)
 Across the Wide Missouri (1951) as Tin Cup Owens (uncredited)
 South of Caliente (1951) as Dave Norris
 Callaway Went Thataway (1951) as Gaffer (uncredited)
 Room for One More (1952) as Ice Man (scenes deleted)
 Finders Keepers (1952) as Frankie Simmons
 This Woman Is Dangerous (1952) as Saunders - Gambling House Prorietor (uncredited)
 Just This Once (1952) as Frank Pirosh
 Singin' in the Rain (1952) as Roscoe Dexter
 Horizons West (1952) as Ed Tompkins
 The Man Behind the Gun (1953) as Buckley
 Kansas Pacific (1953) as Max Janus
 A Slight Case of Larceny (1953) as Mr. White - Circle Star Gas Stations
 The Band Wagon (1953) as Auctioneer (uncredited)
 Cruisin' Down the River (1953) as Humphrey Hepburn
 Cat-Women of the Moon (1953) as Walter 'Walt' Walters
 Red River Shore (1953) as Case Lockwood
 The Naked Jungle (1954) as Medicine Man
 Untamed Heiress (1954) as Pal
 Southwest Passage (1954) as Toad Ellis
 Casanova's Big Night (1954) as Second Prisoner
 The Lone Gun (1954) as Bartender
 The High and the Mighty (1954) as Alsop
 Deep in My Heart (1954) as Harold Butterfield
 3 Ring Circus (1954) as Army Payroll Officer (uncredited)
 The Lonesome Trail (1955) as Crazy Charley Bonesteel
 The Girl Rush (1955) as Charlie - Stickman
 Texas Lady (1955) as Clay Ballard
 The Broken Star (1956) as Hiram Charleton
 Bandido (1956) as McGhee
 Man from Del Rio (1956) as Doc Adams
 Rock, Pretty Baby (1956) as 'Pop' Wright
 Kelly and Me (1957) as Dave Gans
 The Badge of Marshal Brennan (1957) as Marshal Matt Brennan
 Bayou (1957) as Emil Hebert
 Raiders of Old California (1957) as Sheriff
 The Geisha Boy (1958) as GI in Korea (uncredited)
 A Gift for Heidi (1958) as Alm Uncle
 These Thousand Hills (1959) as Whitey (uncredited)
 Desire in the Dust (1960) as Zuba Wilson
 Buffalo Gun (1961) as Sheriff
 Barabbas (1961) as Vasasio
 The Andy Griffith Show (1963) season 4 episode 12 "Opie and His Merry Men" as Hobo
 Miracle of the White Stallions (1963) as Lt. General Walton H. Walker
 Who's Been Sleeping in My Bed? (1963) as Photographer (uncredited)
 7 Faces of Dr. Lao (1964) as Toothless Cowboy
 Guns of Diablo (1965) as Mr. Knudsen
 Nightmare in the Sun (1965)
 Daniel Boone (1964 TV series) - Rufus C. Hoops - S2/E24 "The Search" (1966)
 The Good Guys and the Bad Guys (1969) as Grundy
 Run, Cougar, Run (1972) as Joe Bickley
 Walking Tall (1973) as Judge Clarke 
 Homebodies (1974) as Mr. Crawford
 The Moneychangers (1976) as Danny Kerrigan
 Won Ton Ton, the Dog Who Saved Hollywood (1976) as Second Drunk (uncredited)
 From Noon till Three (1976) as Buck Bowers
 Black Oak Conspiracy (1977) as Bryan Hancock 
 The White Buffalo (1977) as Amos Bixby (Train Conductor / narrator)
 The North Avenue Irregulars (1979) as Delaney

References

External links

 
 
 

1911 births
1998 deaths
20th-century American male actors
American male film actors
American male stage actors
American male television actors
United States Navy personnel of World War II
Burials in Riverside County, California
Male actors from Los Angeles
Male actors from New York City
Metro-Goldwyn-Mayer contract players
People from the Bronx
Xavier High School (New York City) alumni
Western (genre) television actors